Gilbert de Insula (Anglicised: Gilbert of the Isles) was a son of Domhnall mac Alasdair, who received a charter for unspecified lands in the Stirlingshire region, in the year 1330. He also received a charter for half the lands of Glorat in the parish of Campsie. Today, Gilbert de Insula is considered to be a grandson of Alasdair Mór. He is also considered to possibly be the ancestor of the Alexanders of Menstrie.

Citations

References

Clan MacAlister
Medieval Gaels from Scotland
People from Argyll and Bute
14th-century Scottish people
Year of birth unknown